Godin is a lunar impact crater located just to the south of the crater Agrippa, on a rough upland region to the east of Sinus Medii. Its diameter is 34 km. The crater was named after 18th century French astronomer Louis Godin. The ruined crater Tempel lies to the northeast, on the east side of Agrippa. Due south is the flooded remains of Lade.

The rim of Godin is wider in the southern half than in the north, giving it a slightly pear-shaped outline. The interior is rough-surfaced, with a higher albedo than the surroundings. At the midpoint a central peak rises from the floor. A faint ray system surrounds the crater, and extends for about 375 kilometers.  Due to its rays, Godin is mapped as part of the Copernican System.

Satellite craters
By convention these features are identified on lunar maps by placing the letter on the side of the crater midpoint that is closest to Godin.

References

Further reading

External links

Godin at The Moon Wiki
 , regarding Agrippa and Godin craters
 , regarding Agrippa, Godin, Torricelli and Eratosthenes craters

Impact craters on the Moon